IGS may stand for:

Computers/Video Games 
Information Global Service, Japanese video game company
Initial Graphics Exchange Specification and the file extension thereof (.igs)
InteGraphics Systems a former computer graphics chip manufacturer, also known as IGS, founded in 1993
Interactive geometry software
International Games System, a Taiwan-based arcade and PC video game developer, founded 1989
Internet Go server, server that allows players of the game of Go to play
IGS Go server, Japanese Go server

Technology 
Image guided surgery or computer assisted surgery
Inertial guidance system
Information Gathering Satellite, Japanese military reconnaissance satellites
Instrument guidance system

Science 
Institute of General Semantics
Institute of Geological Sciences (disambiguation)
Intergenic spacer
International Glaciological Society
International Graphonomics Society
International GNSS Service

Schools 
Ilkley Grammar School
International Grammar School, Sydney
Ipswich Grammar School
Islington Green School
Ivanhoe Grammar School

Other 
Imerslund-Gräsbeck syndrome
International Graduates Scheme, a UK immigration scheme
Irish Georgian Society